Tettey may refer to:

 Alexander Tettey (born 1986), Norwegian footballer playing for Norwich City
 Tettey (given name), a Ghanaian masculine given name

See also

 Tettey-Enyo